Vocal Tempo is a Cuban vocal group that won in 2008 the second series of Factor X, the Spanish version of The X Factor. The music contest was broadcast on the Spanish Cuatro television station.

The 6-member group, with all members from Cuba, is an a cappella group that does not use any musical instruments.

Discography

Album
2009: Vocal Tempo

Single
2009: "La Casa Por El Tejado"

External links
Vocal Tempo Official website

The X Factor winners
Cuban musicians
Cuban expatriates in Spain